Davlatmand Kholov (born: 1950) is a musician and singer from Kulob in Tajikistan. He is an expert in the southern folk genre of Tajik music called Falak (lit. "the firmament"). A multi-instrumentalist, trained in Shashmaqam at the Conservatory of Music in Dushanbe, he's well known for his works on the two-string dutar, ghijak, and setar which are popular instruments in Central Asia.

He plays and sings poetry of the Sufi poets, mainly Jalaleddin Rumi;  Davlatmand's outlook is close to Rumi's poetry and philosophy. He also belongs to the post-Soviet nationalist school of thought, or is influenced by "Tajikisation", therefore turning his back on Tajik shashmaqam.  This can be displayed through his works: Sawt-i Falak or "The Voices of Falak", where he creates European symphonic settings to tell tales of Tajik life and rural practices. He released the album Learned & Folk Music on 9 January 1996.

References

External links
BBC Persian (in Cyrillic alphabet)
Charkh-o-Falak, a documentary on Davlatmand and his music

Video
Davlatmand in Cultural Center DOM (Moscow) October 2003

Tajik-language singers
Ethnic Tajik people
Dutar players
20th-century Tajikistani male singers
Tajikistani musicians
Living people
1950 births